In the United Kingdom, there are several Secretaries to the Treasury, who are Treasury ministers nominally acting as secretaries to HM Treasury. The origins of the office are unclear, although it probably originated during Lord Burghley's tenure as Lord Treasurer in the 16th century. The number of secretaries was expanded to two by 1714 at the latest. The Treasury ministers together discharge all the former functions of the Lord Treasurer, which are nowadays nominally vested in the Lords Commissioners of the Treasury. Of the Commissioners, only the Second Lord of the Treasury, who is also the Chancellor of the Exchequer, is a Treasury minister (the others are the Prime Minister and the government whips).

The Chancellor is the senior Treasury minister, followed by the Chief Secretary to the Treasury, who also attends Cabinet and has particular responsibilities for public expenditure. In order of seniority, the junior Treasury ministers are: the Financial Secretary to the Treasury, the Economic Secretary to the Treasury, the Exchequer Secretary to the Treasury, and the Commercial Secretary to the Treasury (currently not in use).

One of the present-day secretaries, the Parliamentary Secretary to the Treasury, formerly known as the Patronage Secretary, is not a Treasury minister but the government whip in the House of Commons. The office can be seen as a sinecure, allowing the Chief Whip to draw a government salary, attend Cabinet, and use a Downing Street residence.

Current Secretaries to the Treasury
Chief Secretary to the Treasury — John Glen
Financial Secretary to the Treasury — Victoria Atkins
Economic Secretary to the Treasury — (City Minister) — Andrew Griffith
Exchequer Secretary to the Treasury — James Cartlidge
Commercial Secretary to the Treasury — Office not in use 
Parliamentary Secretary to the Treasury (Chief Whip) — Simon Hart

Tom Scholar , the Permanent Secretary to the Treasury, is the Civil Service head of the department.

Secretaries to the Treasury

1660–1830
June 1660: Sir Philip Warwick
May 1667: Sir George Downing, Bt
October 1671: Sir Robert Howard
July 1673: Charles Bertie
March 1679: Henry Guy
April 1689: William Jephson
June 1691: Henry Guy
March 1695: William Lowndes

1830–present
Chief Secretary to the Treasury (established 1961)
Financial Secretary to the Treasury (established 1830)
Economic Secretary to the Treasury (established 1947)
Exchequer Secretary to the Treasury (established 1996)

See also
Lord High Treasurer

References

http://www.british-history.ac.uk/report.asp?compid=16741

Finance ministers of the United Kingdom
Ministerial offices in the United Kingdom
Lists of government ministers of the United Kingdom